The Ninetology Outlook Pure (T8700) tablet is powered by a Cortex A9 dual core (1.0 GHz) processor and is running on the Android Ice Cream Sandwich 4.0 Operating System, with 3G capabilities. The device is a result of collaboration between Clixster, Angkatan Koperasi Kebangsaan Malaysia Bhd (ANGKASA) and Ninetology.

History

Release
The Ninetology Outlook Pure (T8700) was announced on at a launch event organized by Clixster on 16 May 2013 and was released to the public for purchase in June.

Feature

Hardware
The Ninetology Outlook Pure (T8700) has a Cortex-A9 dual core 1.0 GHz processor and a 7.0" inch HD LCD capacitive (196 ppi pixel density) display screen with a resolution of 1024 X 600. It possesses a dimension of 192.4 mm (H) X 122.5 mm (W) X 10.5 mm (T) and weighs 330 grams.

The Ninetology Outlook Pure (T8700) supports 3G and WiFi capabilities and has a rear camera with a 2.0 megapixel camera, followed by a 0.3 MP front-facing camera.

The battery has a capacity of Li-Ion 3000mAh.

Additional storage is available via a MicroSD card socket, which is certified to support up to 32 GB of additional storage.

Software
The Ninetology Outlook Pure is running on the Android Ice Cream Sandwich 4.0 Operating System and is preloaded with a variety of applications:
 Web: Native Android Browser 
 Social: Facebook, YouTube
 Media: Camera, Gallery, FM Radio, Music Player, Video Player, 
 Personal Information Management: Calendar, Detail Contact Information
 Utilities: Calculator, Alarm Clock, Google Maps, AirAsia, Voice Recorder, Tune Talk
 Gaming: Diamond Dash, Subway Surfer

References

External links
http://ninetology.com/malaysia/products_tablets_outlook_pure_details.html

Smartphones
Tablet computers introduced in 2013
Android (operating system) devices